Meiyang Chang (born 6 October 1982)  is an Indian actor, television host, singer and a dentist. He came to prominence as a contestant on the third season of the singing reality show Indian Idol. Following this, he began his acting career with the film Badmaash Company. He also appeared in other films like Detective Byomkesh Bakshy, Sultan and Bharat. His latest work includes Undekhi and Modern Love Mumbai.

Early life 
Meiyang is an alumni of the De Nobili School (Dhanbad), Colonel Brown Cambridge School Dehradun and Wynberg Allen School Mussoorie. Chang is a third generation Indian-Chinese, with roots in China's Hubei province. He is also a qualified dentist with a BDS degree from Vokkaligara Sangha Dental College & Hospital, Bangalore.

Filmography

Television

Web series

Films

Dubbing roles

Discography

See also
List of Indian dubbing artists

References

External links
Facebook link

1982 births
Living people
Male actors in Hindi cinema
Indian dentists
Indian male film actors
Indian Buddhists
Indian television presenters
Indian people of Chinese descent
People from Dhanbad
Dancing with the Stars winners
Indian Idol participants
Male actors of Chinese descent
Fear Factor: Khatron Ke Khiladi participants